Angola competed in the Olympic Games for the first time at the 1980 Summer Olympics in Moscow, USSR.

Athletics 

Men
Track & road events

Boxing

Men

Swimming

Men

Women

References
International Olympic Committee, Moscow '80, Fizkulturai Sport Publishers, 1980
Official Olympic Reports
Sports Reference

Nations at the 1980 Summer Olympics
1980
Olympics